Langston is a name of English origin. People with the name include:

People with the given name
 Langston Galloway (born 1991), American basketball player
 Langston Hall (born 1991), American basketball player
 Langston Hughes (1902–1967), African-American poet, novelist, playwright, and newspaper columnist
 Langston Walker (born 1979), American football player
 Langston Moore (born 1981), American football player

People with the surname
 Big E Langston (born 1986), American professional wrestler
 Charles Henry Langston (1817–1892), African-American abolitionist and political activist
 Clinton Langston (born 1962), British Anglican priest and military chaplain
 Dicey Langston (1766–1837), Patriot spy at the time of the American Revolution
 Grant Langston (motorcyclist) (born 1982), South African motocross champion
 Grant Langston (musician) (born 1966), American singer-songwriter
 John Langston (MP) (–1812), English merchant banker and politician, Member of Parliament (MP) 1784–1807
 John Mercer Langston (1829–1897), U.S. civil rights pioneer, first African-American member of Congress
 Mark Langston (born 1960), Major League Baseball pitcher
 Michael Langston, computer scientist in field of bioinformatics and computational biology
 Murray Langston, Canadian-American known as The Unknown Comic
 Peter Langston (born 1946), computer programmer
 Wann Langston, Jr. (1921–2013), American paleontologist
 William Langston, American neurologist

People with the middle name
 John Langston Gwaltney (1928–1998), African-American writer and anthropologist
 Jamie Langston Turner (born 1949), American novelist

Fictional characters
Howard Langston, a fictional character from the 1996 film Jingle All the Way
 Langston Wilde Cramer, a fictional character from the American soap opera One Life to Live
 Langston Field, a fictional technology found in the book The Mote in God's Eye
 Langston Graham, a fictional character from the television series Chuck
 Raymond Langston, a fictional character from the television series CSI: Crime Scene Investigation
Sally Langston, a fictional character from the television series Scandal
Baby Langston, "Sugarland Express"

See also
Lanston